Almir Bekić (born 1 June 1989) is a Bosnian professional footballer who plays for Bosnian Premier League club Zrinjski Mostar.

Club career
A product of the Sloboda Tuzla academy, Bekić had his professional debut on 14 November 2007 playing 20 minutes in a Bosnian Premier League match against Velež Mostar. However, Bekić spent the following couple of years mainly playing at youth level before finally establishing himself as a first-team regular in the 2009–10 season, in which he appeared in 24 league matches and scored 1 goal for the Bosnian side.

In July 2010, Bekić was picked up by Croatian powerhouse Dinamo Zagreb for a €100.000 transfer fee.

At half-season in 2012, Bekić returned to Sloboda Tuzla, where he scored 3 goals. But after Sloboda got relegated to the First League of FBiH, Dinamo sent Bekić on a loan to GOŠK Gabela. His first games were solid, but in the spring part of the season he played even better, becoming of the best players of GOŠK. He scored 4 goals and added 5 assist.

International career
Bekić was capped for the Bosnia and Herzegovina U21 national team and made his senior debut for Bosnia and Herzegovina in a June 2016 friendly match away against Japan and has earned a total of 3 caps, scoring no goals. His final international was a January 2018 friendly against Mexico.

Career statistics

Club

International

Honours
Sarajevo 
Bosnian Premier League: 2018–19
Bosnian Cup: 2018–19

Zrinjski Mostar
Bosnian Premier League: 2021–22

References

External links

1989 births
Living people
Sportspeople from Tuzla
Association football wingers
Association football fullbacks
Bosnia and Herzegovina footballers
Bosnia and Herzegovina under-21 international footballers
Bosnia and Herzegovina international footballers
FK Sloboda Tuzla players
NK Lokomotiva Zagreb players
NK GOŠK Gabela players
NK Sesvete players
GNK Dinamo Zagreb players
FK Sarajevo players
HŠK Zrinjski Mostar players
Premier League of Bosnia and Herzegovina players
Croatian Football League players
First Football League (Croatia) players
Bosnia and Herzegovina expatriate footballers
Expatriate footballers in Croatia
Bosnia and Herzegovina expatriate sportspeople in Croatia